The first hearing aid was created in the 17th century. The movement toward modern hearing aids began with the creation of the telephone, and the first electric hearing aid was created in 1898. By the late 20th century, the digital hearing aid was distributed to the public commercially. Some of the first hearing aids were external hearing aids. External hearing aids directed sounds in front of the ear and blocked all other noises. The apparatus would fit behind or in the ear.

The invention of the carbon microphone, transmitters, digital signal processing chip or DSP, and the development of computer technology helped transform the hearing aid to its present form.

Ear trumpet

The use of ear trumpets for the partially deaf, dates back to the 17th century. By the late 18th century, their use was becoming increasingly common. Collapsible conical ear trumpets were made by instrument makers on a one-off basis for specific clients. Well known models of the period included the Townsend Trumpet (made by the deaf educator John Townshend), the Reynolds Trumpet (specially built for painter Joshua Reynolds) and the Daubeney Trumpet.

The first firm to begin commercial production of the ear trumpet was established by Frederick C. Rein in London in 1800. As well as producing ear trumpets, Rein also sold hearing fans, and speaking tubes. These instruments helped amplify sounds, while still being portable. However, these devices were generally bulky and had to be physically supported from below. Later, smaller, hand-held ear trumpets and cones were used as hearing aids.

 
Rein was commissioned to design a special acoustic chair for the ailing King John VI of Portugal in 1819. The throne was designed with ornately carved arms that looked like the open mouths of lions. These holes acted as the receiving area for the acoustics, which were transmitted to the back of the throne via a speaking tube, and into the king's ear.
Finally in the late 1800s, the acoustic horn, which was a tube that had two ends, a cone that captured sound, and was eventually made to fit in the ear.

Toward the late 19th century, hidden hearing aids became increasingly popular. Rein pioneered many notable designs, including his 'acoustic headbands', where the hearing aid device was artfully concealed within the hair or headgear. Reins' Aurolese Phones were headbands, made in a variety of shapes, that incorporated sound collectors near the ear that would amplify the acoustics. Hearing aids were also hidden in couches, clothing, and accessories. This drive toward ever increasing invisibility was often more about hiding the individual's disability from the public than about helping the individual cope with his or her problem.

Electronic hearing aids

The first electronic hearing aids were constructed after the invention of the telephone and microphone in the 1870s and 1880s. The technology within the telephone increased how acoustic signal could be altered. Telephones were able to control the loudness, frequency, and distortion of sounds. These abilities were used in the creation of the hearing aid.

The first electric hearing aid, called the Akouphone, was created by Miller Reese Hutchison in 1898. It used a carbon transmitter, so that the hearing aid could be portable. The carbon transmitter was used to amplify sound by taking a weak signal and using electric current to make it a strong signal. These electronic hearing aids could eventually be shrunk into purses and other accessories.

One of the first manufacturers of the electronically amplified hearing aid was the Siemens company in 1913. Their hearing aids were bulky and not easily portable. They were about the size of a "tall cigar box" and had a speaker that would fit in the ear.

The first vacuum tube hearing aid was patented by a Naval engineer Earl Hanson in 1920. It was called the Vactuphone and used the telephone transmitter to turn speech into electrical signals. After the signal was converted, it would be amplified when it moved to the receiver. The hearing aid weighed seven pounds, which made it light enough to be carried. Marconi in England and Western Electric in the US began marketing vacuum tube hearing aids in 1923.

During the 1920s and 1930s, the vacuum tube hearing aid became more successful and began to decrease in size with better miniaturization techniques. The Acousticon's Model 56 was created in the mid-1920s and was one of the first portable hearing aid units, although it was quite heavy. The first wearable hearing aid using vacuum tube technology went on sale in England in 1936, and a year later in the United States. By the 1930s, hearing aids were becoming popular to the public. Multitone of London patented the first hearing aid to use automatic gain control. The same company introduced a wearable version in 1948.

Military technological advances that occurred in World War II helped the development of hearing aids. One of the major advances that World War II enabled was the idea of miniaturization. This could be seen by Zenith's pocket-sized Miniature 75.

Transistor hearing aids 

The development of transistors in 1948 by Bell Laboratories led to major improvements to the hearing aid. The transistor was invented by John Bardeen, Walter Brattain, and William Shockley.  Transistors were created to replace vacuum tubes; they were small, required less battery power and had less distortion and heat than their predecessor. These vacuum tubes were typically hot and fragile, so the transistor was the ideal replacement. The 1952 Sonotone 1010 used a transistor stage along with vacuum tubes, to extend battery life.   The size of these transistors led to developments in miniature, carbon microphones. These microphones could be mounted on various items, even eyeglasses. In 1951, Raytheon manufactured the transistor and was one of the first companies to mass-produce transistors to throughout America. Raytheon realized that their hearing aid only lasted short-term and began to sell the vacuum-tube hearing aids again along with transistor hearing aids.

The act of putting transistors into hearing aids was so quick that they were not properly tested. It was later found that transistors could get damp. Because of this dampness, the hearing aid would only last for a few weeks and then die. In order to stop this from happening, a coating had to be put on the transistor to protect it from the dampness. This problem had to be fixed in order for transistors in hearing aids to be successful.

Zenith was the first company to realize the problem with transistors was the body heat of individuals. After coming to this conclusion, the first "all-transistor" hearing aids were offered in 1952, called the Microtone Transimatic and the Maico Transist-ear. In 1954, the company, Texas Instruments, produced a silicon transistor, which was much more effective than the previous version.  The end of the transistor was marked by the creation of the integrated circuit or IC by Jack Kilby at Texas Instruments in 1958 and the technique was perfected in hearing aids over the next 20 years.

Elmer V. Carlson, the author of thirty patents, was instrumental in inventing many of the components of the modern hearing aid.

Digital hearing aid 
Beginning in the early 1960s, Bell Telephone Laboratories created digital processing for creating both speech and audio signals on a large mainframe computer. Because of the slow processing ability of these large digital computers of the era, the process of simulating hearing aids was extremely slow. The processing of the audio speech signal took longer than the length of the duration of the speech signal itself preventing the processing of speech in real time. This made it nearly impossible to conceive the idea that a self-contained, wearable digital hearing aid could be made small enough to fit onto an ear like a conventional analog hearing aid. However, this digital processing research was important for learning about how to develop sounds for those with hearing disabilities.

In the 1970s, the microprocessor was created. This microprocessor helped to open up the door to miniaturization of the digital hearing aid. Moreover, researcher Edgar Villchur developed an analog multi-channel amplitude compression device with amplitude compression that enabled the audio signal to be separated into frequency bands. These frequency bands were able to adjust the analog sound non-linearly so that loud sounds could be less amplified and weak sounds could become more amplified. The system of multi-channel amplitude compression would be later used as the fundamental structural design for the first hearing aids that used digital technology.
  
Also in the 1970s the creation of a hybrid hearing aid was possible in which the analog components of a conventional hearing aid consisting of amplifiers, filters and signal limiting were combined with a separate digital programmable component into a conventional hearing aid case. The audio processing remained analog but was able to be controlled by the digital programmable component. The digital component could be programmed by connecting the device to an external computer in the laboratory then disconnected to allow the hybrid device to function as a conventional wearable hearing aid.

The hybrid device was effective from a practical point of view because of the low power consumption and compact size. At that time, low-power analog amplifier technology was well developed in contrast to the available semiconductor chips able to process audio in real time. The combination of high performance analog components for real time audio processing and a separate low power digital programmable component only for controlling the analog signal led to the creation several low power digital programmable components able to implement different types of digital control of analog circuits.

A hybrid hearing aid was developed by Etymotic Design. A little later, Mangold and Lane created a programmable multi-channel hybrid hearing aid. Graupe with co-authors developed a digital programmable component that implemented an adaptive noise filter that could be added to a hybrid hearing aid.

The creation of high-speed digital-array processors used in minicomputers opened up the door for advances in full digital hearing aids.  These minicomputers were able to process audio signals at speeds that were equivalent to real-time. In 1982, at the City University of New York, a real-time full digital experimental hearing aid was created based on the digital array processor in an external, standalone minicomputer and an FM radio transmitter that allowed a wireless connection between the minicomputer and individual wearing a transmitter on the body. The FM transmitter on the body was connected by a wire to an ear microphone and loudspeaker. Technically this was a wearable hearing aid though it was not self contained and the range the user could use it was limited by the range of the wireless connection and the external minicomputer was extremely heavy and nearly impossible to move
 preventing it from being used as conventional hearing aid in real world environments. However, this was a major breakthrough in the creation of a full digital hearing aid.

Also in the early 1980s a research group at Central Institute for the Deaf headed up by faculty members at Washington University in St. Louis MO created the first full digital wearable hearing aid. They first conceived a complete, comprehensive full digital hearing aid, then designed and fabricated, miniaturized full digital computer chips using custom digital signal processing chips with low power and very large scale integrated (VLSI) chip technology able to process both the audio signal in real time and the control signals yet able to be powered by a battery and be fully wearable as a full digital wearable hearing aid able to be actually used by individuals with hearing loss in any environment similar to a conventional hearing aid. Engebretson, Morley and Popelka were the inventors of the first full digital hearing aid. Their work resulted in US Patent 4,548,082, "Hearing aids, signal supplying apparatus, systems for compensating hearing deficiencies, and methods" by A Maynard Engebretson, Robert E Morley, Jr. and Gerald R Popelka, filed in 1984 and issued in 1985. This full digital wearable hearing aid also included many additional features now used in all contemporary full digital hearing aids including a bidirectional interface with an external computer, self-calibration, self-adjustment, wide bandwidth, digital programmability, a fitting algorithm based on audibility, internal storage of digital programs, and fully digital multichannel amplitude compression and output limiting. This group created several of these full digital hearing aids and used them for research on hearing impaired people as they wore them in the same manner as conventional hearing aids in real-world situations. In this first full DHA all stages of sound processing and control were carried out in binary form. The external sound from microphones positioned in an ear module identical to a BTE was first converted into binary code, then digitally processed and digitally controlled in real time, then converted back to an analog signal sent to miniature loudspeakers positioned in the same BTE ear module. These specialized hearing aid chips continued to become smaller, increase in computational ability and require even less power. Now, virtually all commercial hearing aids are fully digital and their digital signal processing capability has significantly increased. Very small and very low power specialized digital hearing aid chips are now used in all hearing aids manufactured worldwide. Many additional new features also have been added with various on-board advanced wireless technology.

The first commercial full digital hearing aid was created in 1987 by the Nicolet Corporation. The hearing aid contained a body-worn processor that had a hardwire connection with an ear mounted transducer. While the Nicolet Corporation's hearing aid was not publicly successful and the company shortly folded, it was able to start a competition among hearing aid manufacturers to create more effective full digital hearing aids. Two years later, in 1989, the commercial behind-the-ear (BTE) full digital hearing aid was launched.

In addition to the Nicolet Corporation, Bell Laboratories expanded upon the hearing aid business by developing a hybrid digital-analog hearing aid. This hearing aid used digital circuits to handle a two-channel compression amplifier. Even though early research on this hearing aid was successful, AT&T, the parent company to Bell Laboratories, pulled out of the hearing aid market and sold its rights to Resound Corporation in 1987. When the hybrid hearing aid was put on in the market, it helped bring major changes to the world of the hybrid hearing aid.

After the success of the Resound Corporation, other hearing aid manufacturers began putting out hybrid hearing aids that included analog amplifiers, filters, and limiters that were managed digitally. There were many benefits to these hearing aids that included storing parameter settings, having a capability for paired-comparison testing, having settings for different acoustic environments, and having more advanced methods of signal processing that included multi-channel compression.

The next major milestone was creating a commercial full digital hearing aid. The Oticon Company developed the first commercial full digital hearing aid in 1995, but it was only distributed to audiological research centers for research on digital technology in the realm of acoustic amplification. The Senso was the first commercially successful, full digital hearing aid, and was created by Widex in 1996.  After the success of the Senso, Oticon began marketing their own hearing aid, the DigiFocus.

Current digital hearing aids are now programmable which enables digital hearing aids to regulate the sound on their own, without using a separate control. The full digital hearing aid can now adjust itself depending on what environment it is in and often does not even need a physical volume control button.

Recently,  "Made for iPhone hearing aids" (MFi) were introduced by Resound, which enables users of MFi digital hearing aids to stream phone calls, music, and podcasts directly from iOS devices.

Directly leveraging the audio processing power potential in smartphones, Jacoti BVBA from Belgium developed ListenApp, the first digital hearing aid application to win CE certification and FDA approval as a medical device.

Hearing aid chips
One of the first digital chips was created by Daniel Graupe.  The digital chip, referred to as the Zeta Noise Blocker, routinely adjusted the gain in the frequency channels to help control high levels of noise.  The chip was integrated in a number of hearing aids in the 1980s.  In addition to the Zeta Noise Blocker, there was a development of digital chips that were devoted to high-speed digital signal processing or DSP. DSP chips became available in 1982, and began to be implemented into hearing aids. By 1988, chips were produced in hearing aids. One of the major contributions of these chips was the ability to process both speech and other types of noises in real time. One major down fall of these chips was that they were massive and used up a lot of battery, which made them nearly impossible to be worn.

See also
Spatial hearing loss

References

External links
 

Hearing aids
Hearing aids